Westwood Marshes Mill is a Grade II listed tower mill at Walberswick, Suffolk, England which is derelict.

History

Westwood Marshes Mill was built in the late 18th century, possibly in 1798. It was worked by wind until 1940 and then damaged when used for target practice during World War II. The mill was repaired in the 1950s but in October 1960 it was burnt out in an arson attack. It remains standing in a derelict state.

Description

Westwood Marshes Mill is a three-storey tower mill. It had a boat-shaped cap which was winded by a tailpole and winch, in a similar manner to the smock mill at Herringfleet. There were four common sails carried on a cast-iron windshaft. The wooden brake wheel drove a wooden wallower which was carried on the wooden upright shaft. This carries a cast-iron spur wheel which drives a cast-iron pit wheel with wooden cogs, carried on a wooden axle, as is the cast-iron scoop wheel with wooden paddles. Only the lower part of the upright shaft and the pit wheel and scoopwheel survived the fire. As well as the scoopwheel, the mill drove a pair of millstones which was used to grind feed for horses on the estate where the mill stood.

Marshmen

Jack Stannard - c. 1914
Bob Westcott c. 1914 - 1940

References

External links
Windmill World webpage on Westwood Marshes Mill.

Industrial buildings completed in 1798
Windmills in Suffolk
Tower mills in the United Kingdom
Grinding mills in the United Kingdom
Grade II listed buildings in Suffolk
Grade II listed windmills
Walberswick